Fiore means flower in Italian. It may refer to:

Fiore (surname), notable people with the surname
San Giovanni in Fiore, town in southern Italy (Calabria)
Fiore (Pokémon), a region in the fictional Pokémon universe
Sailor Moon R movie#Fiore, a character in the Sailor Moon R movie
Fiore, a country that appears in the anime and manga series Fairy Tail    
Fiore (album), an album by Arisa Mizuki
Fiore (film), a 2016 Italian film
Fiore Buccieri (1907-1973), Chicago mobster
Fiore de Henriquez (1921-2004), female Italian-British sculptor
Fiore dei Liberi, Italian renaissance master of arms

Italian unisex given names